The four stars above Uruguay's football crest represent the four FIFA recognized senior (non-amateur) world titles won by the Uruguay national football team in 1924, 1928, 1930 and 1950. The Olympic football tournaments of Paris 1924 and Amsterdam 1928 have been recognized by global football associations from the outset as open world championships, the only editions to be subsequently accepted as equivalents to the FIFA World Cup. As of May 30, 2022, the Uruguayan Football Association (AUF) has announced that Uruguay have been permitted to continue wearing four stars on their football crest for the fifth consecutive FIFA World Cup tournament.

FIFA organizes the 1924 and 1928 Olympic football tournaments as open world championships 

The 1924 and 1928 Olympic football tournaments had several distinctions that separate them from other editions organized before and after. Firstly, these championships were principally administered by FIFA, the French and Dutch football associations respectively, without obstructive involvement from the International Olympic Committee. Secondly, these two Olympic football tournaments were the first ones in history that were open to all players, including professionals. From the outset, FIFA, the football associations and media outlets from across the globe recognized the legitimacy of these Olympic football tournaments as being exceptional due to these "open" regulations.

Uruguay adds four stars on their football crest 

In 1992, the Uruguay national football team successfully added four stars on their football crest for the first time with approval from FIFA. The request was put forward by Uruguayan football historian and journalist Atilio Garrido, who cited that in 1924, the AUF submitted their official reports to FIFA titled "Uruguay World Football Champion at the Olympics in Paris". In addition to this, in 1928, the Uruguayan association did the same thing, except this time calling their documents: "Olimpiada de Amsterdam, Uruguay campeón del mundo" ("Amsterdam Olympiad, Uruguay World Champions"). These reports were formally submitted to FIFA in 1925 and 1929, and were approved with no objections. In 1992, at the FIFA congress in Zürich, Atilio Garrido successfully argued Uruguay's official standing as four-time senior (non-amateur) world champions recognized by FIFA as being: "inscribes itself in the continuity of what was officially registered by the directives of that time."

The AUF adheres to FIFA's uniform regulations 

FIFA has strict conditions for the adding of stars on a national team's football crest during the FIFA World Cup. Only teams that have won a World Cup can display a five-pointed star on their badge.

Adhering these official FIFA guidelines, the Uruguay national football team has been permitted to wear their four stars on their crest in five consecutive World Cup appearances: 2002, 2010, 2014, 2018 and 2022. An example of FIFA not approving stars on a football crest occurred in 2018, when the Egyptian National Team had to remove their seven stars before the World Cup in Russia, representing the seven African Cup of Nations that they had previously won.

Publications of a contradictory history 
In his book Thirty-six Lies by Jules Rimet: A Critique of the influential book "Wonderful History of the World Cup", historian Pierre Arrighi examines the creation of a contemporary revisionist history of football, which attempts to distance FIFA from the International Olympic Committee. Arrighi notes several statements made by proponents of this version of history (notably: certain FIFA executives and football historians) that directly contradicts ones made by past FIFA representatives, official promotional media, the French Football Federation (in 1924), the Dutch Football Association (in 1928), the International Olympic Committee, as well as FIFA President Jules Rimet himself.

Firstly, in his 1954 book Histoire Merveilleuse de la Coupe du Monde (Wonderful History of the World Cup) Jules Rimet for the first time began to distance FIFA from its Olympic history by declaring that the first world championship was the 1930 FIFA World Cup. Rimet's growing disdain towards the Olympic movement in general was something that was well known in his later years as a reason for this change in perspective. Thus, he began to distance himself from prominent football figures like Pierre de Coubertin, even through, as Arrighi wrote:  "Coubertin's Union des Sociétés Françaises de Sports Athlétiques founded FIFA in 1904 and Jules Rimet held various positions within the French Olympic bodies for virtually his entire lifetime. Secondly, FIFA directly managed the football tournaments at the Olympics in 1924, and 1928, and from 1936 onwards, and their worldwide development after 1923 was largely due to the power of attraction exerted by the Olympic games."

Jules Rimet new posture was also question for minimizing his relationship with Henri Delaunay, a very prominent French football administrator of the time and Baron Pierre de Coubertin (founder of the International Olympic Committee) and his growing disdain towards the Olympic movement in general was something that was well known in his later years as a reason for this change in perspective. The historian notes that: "Pierre de Coubertin's Union des Sociétés Françaises de Sports Athlétiques founded FIFA in 1904 and Jules Rimet held various positions within the French Olympic bodies for virtually his entire lifetime. Secondly, FIFA directly managed the football tournaments at the Olympics in 1924, and 1928, and from 1936 onwards, and their worldwide development after 1923 was largely due to the power of attraction exerted by the Olympic games."

Jules Rimet's contradictory version of football history was later adopted in 1980 by Joseph Blatter (at the time FIFA's Technical Director), who asked Tony Mason (History Professor at the De Montfort University in Leicester) and French Historian Alfred Wahl to create a book titled FIFA 1904-2004: The Century of Football. This book was meant to reflect this cultivated version of football history which would situate FIFA as the primary organization that exclusively organized the first football world championship. Due to this publication, a dissimilar view of history began to circulate, stating that every edition of the Olympic football tournaments before 1930, including the open (non-amateur) tournaments in 1924 and 1928, were to be considered "amateur world titles" at a lesser standing to the FIFA World Cup. This narrative was further broadcast in FIFA's 2017 book The Official History of the FIFA World Cup. However, critics from around the world (such as: historians Pierre Arrighi of France and Márcio Trevisan of Brazil) began to find several issues with this revisionist attempt. For example, Arrighi noted that the committees assigned to write these books were only made up of Europeans, proving a prejudiced bias, with no South Americans at the table.

Arrighi continued to denounce how several of these authors still questioned FIFA's involvement with the International Olympic Committee as one of their main arguments against the recognition of the 1924 and 1928 Olympic football tournaments as open (non-amateur) world championships. For example, the historian noted that FIFA's author Tony Mason erroneously mentioned that the IOC was issuing its authority over FIFA "from above", although there are primary documents  proving the contrary: that FIFA had autonomy over the IOC in the 1924 Olympic football tournament, as well as in the 1928 edition. Arrighi also recorded that, in reality, there are several published instances that prove that neither the French National Olympic and Sports Committee nor the International Olympic Committee wanted to get involved with FIFA, and instead orchestrated Jules Rimet's isolation and total impermeability between the football tournament and the rest of the Olympic games. Regarding this division of powers, Arrighi wrote: "As the successive statements published by France Football clearly demonstrate, Rimet's position was not to leave the Olympic Games, but to enter more, much higher and more definitively as a major influencer."

Moreover, the leading organizations that administered the Olympic football tournaments of 1924 and 1928 have confirmed on several occasions FIFA's relationship with the International Olympic Committee during that time. For example, in their officially sanctioned book 100 Historical Dates Objects of French Football (published in 2011), the French Football Federation wrote that "in the middle of those crazy years, the tournament at the Paris Olympic Games was a real success", and that "in its organization, the French National Olympic and Sports Committee acted jointly with FIFA and the French Football Federation", conclusively rejecting Tony Mason's assertion of FIFA's lack of involvement and influence in the 1924 and 1928 Olympic football tournaments.

Arrighi concluded that Jules Rimet was also the Vice President of France's National Olympic and Sports Committee, and that he had been instructed to prepare the infrastructures common to all disciplines (such as: fields, administration and the Olympic Village), as well as being in charge of summoning all the athletes. The current position of FIFA's public relations services noted that "The 1924 tournament was a test of high sporting value organized by FIFA", disproving the contradicting arguments proposed by Rimet in 1954, and Tony Mason posteriorly. As well, in 2010, FIFA 's official position regarding the 1924 and 1928 Olympic Football tournaments was transmitted to Pierre Arrighi by their Public Relations Service in an email dated August 3, 2010. The message stated that FIFA "recognized the 2 additional stars of Uruguay as precursor tournaments of the World Cup, of high sporting level and organized by FIFA."

2021 incident with Puma 

In 2021, a leaked email was sent by Puma to the AUF, in which Puma revealed that a FIFA employee had asked them to remove two of the stars on Uruguay's crest before an upcoming FIFA World Cup qualifier. The AUF organized a defence of the validity of their stars with several historians and primary documents that were later presented to FIFA. After listening to the appeal, FIFA retracted their request, with Pierre Arrighi's evidence being reportedly key in the new FIFA administration withdrawing their stance. Uruguay were permitted to use the 4 stars vs. Colombia on October 7, 2021. On May 30, 2022, Uruguay announced a new jersey for the 2022 FIFA World Cup with 4 stars approved for the fifth consecutive tournament (2002, 2010, 2014, 2018, 2022), referring to their official standing as four-time senior (non-amateur) world champions recognized by FIFA.

References throughout history 
Since the early 1930s, the officialization of the 1924 and 1928 Olympic football tournaments being recognized as equivalents to the FIFA World Cup has been discussed by various FIFA administrations, media outlets, football historians and football associations until most recently in 2021. For example:
 1924: Très Sport Magazine from France declares Uruguay champions of the world after winning the world championship organized by FIFA and the French Football Federation.
 1930: Chilean World Cup History book named Uruguay a "three-time world champion" shortly after winning the title in Montevideo.
 1943: John Langenus, The referee of the 1928 Olympic football final, and of the 1930 FIFA World Cup final, confirmed the popularly accepted notion that the 1924 and 1928 Olympic football tournaments were equivalents to the FIFA World Cup. In his 1932 book, Whistling Around the World, the Belgian referee explained the names of the stands of the Estadio Centenario: "Those behind the arches had been baptized Colombes and Amsterdam in memory of the first world title victories". He noted that the main grandstand was called "America" because, as he put it, "a third world title victory was expected in Montevideo".
 1944: The book Football Joie du Monde by ex-footballer and renowned journalist Maurice Pefferkorn explained how 20 years after the 1924 final in Colombes, he was still impacted by the memory of that July 9 final between Uruguay and Switzerland, feeling the "mysticism and sentimental exaltation guided the 55,000 spectators at the announcement that the title of world champion was in play." FIFA President Jules Rimet agreed with Pekkerforn's assertion and further praised his research for being a "a meticulous investigation, a complete and sure documentation, and above all an intellectual probity that results from a curiosity never satisfied."
 1950: Football broadcaster Carlos Solé called Uruguay "World champions for the fourth time" after Uruguay defeated Brazil 2–1 in the Maracanazo.
 1950: El Informador from Mexico names Uruguay a four-time world champion after winning the World Cup in Rio de Janeiro.
 1954: In his book Histoire Merveilleuse de la Coupe du Monde (Wonderful History of the World Cup), FIFA President Julles Rimet signalled that in the 1930 World Cup Uruguay conquered a "triple crown of victory", referencing how the 1924 and 1928 Olympic football titles were recognized as valid senior (non-amateur) world titles by FIFA.
 1962: Argentina's El Grafico magazine names Uruguay as a four-time world champion, citing the open (non-amateur) world titles won in 1924, 1928, 1930 and 1950.
 2001: A March 30, 2011 article published by the International Olympic Committee states: "Today, the shirts worn by the players of La Celeste are notable for their four gold stars. This is because they won the two Olympic tournaments held before the creation of the World Cup. A decoration fully acknowledged by FIFA, which recognizes the Olympic tournaments in 1924 and 1928 as world championships."
 2002: The FIFA approved DVD set of History Of Soccer: The Beautiful Game states that Uruguay are four-time FIFA World champions on several occasions. This was specifically quoted in Volume 3. South American Superpowers: Uruguay's Golden Age: "In 1924, With a population of just 3 million inhabitants, Uruguay had taught the Europeans a lesson and had become world champions...In 1928, when Uruguay scored the winning goal in the second-half, it already meant a second consecutive world title for the eastern band…Uruguay was the first world cup champion and won three consecutive world titles…In 1950 the diminutive Uruguay already had the second world cup and a fourth world title."
 2004: The FIFA sanctioned book 100 years of glory: The True History of Uruguayan Football has an entire section dedicated to primary official FIFA documents that confirm Uruguay's official standing as four-time (non-amateur) world champions recognized by FIFA by citing quotes from past administrations as well.
 2008: A France vs. Uruguay international friendly was officially designated by the French Football Federation as "Match Des 5 Étoiles" (The match of 5 stars)
 2010: Football historian Didier Rey, writing for the French newspaper Libéracion on July 6, 2010, wrote: "When in 1930, two years after the victory in Amsterdam, La Celeste imposed its law on Argentina again in the final of the first edition of the 1930 World Cup organized by FIFA, becoming the first triple world champion in the history of football, which was consecrated in a span of just six years." Rey further added: "This required a tacit agreement between FIFA and the IOC, which stated that a victory at the Olympic games effectively designated the world champion."
 2019: Historian Márcio Trevisan, in his book A História do Futebol para quem tem pressa (A History of Football for those in a hurry) also disputed FIFA and Tony Mason's versions of football history, detailing in his book several instances of FIFA and world media outlets recognizing the 1924 Olympic football tournament as the legitimate first open (non-amateur) world championship. In the chapter titled "Olympics: The 'Start' for the World Cup, Trevisan wrote: "Uruguay was the first nation to be crowned four-time world champion. That's right: our neighbours in the south boast four golden stars on the symbol of their confederation, and they do so with full knowledge and approval by FIFA."
 2020: Pierre Arrighi's book 1924: First Football World Championship in History details Uruguay's standing as a four-time senior (non-amateur) world champion with several primary and secondary documents from decades past. The research found in this book was integral in FIFA retracting their decision to request Uruguay to remove 2 of the 4 stars on September 6, 2021.

FIFA Museum recognition 
The FIFA Museum in Zurïch, Switzerland has several mentions of FIFA's recognition of the 1924 and 1928 Olympic football tournaments being officially recognizes by them as open (non-amateur) senior world titles, equivalent to the FIFA World Cup. For example:
 In a section showcasing one of Uruguay's Olympic gold medals, a plaque states: "By Winning Olympic Gold in 1924 and 1928, and the World Cup in 1930, Uruguay achieved a hat-trick of World titles."
 The FIFA Museum also includes the 1924 and 1928 Olympics when referencing Uruguay's record undefeated streak at the FIFA World Cup: "Before their defeat by Hungary, Uruguay were undefeated in 21 world championship matches spread over 30 years, which includes two Olympics and three World Cups."
 In this section, featuring an old pocket watch owned by Uruguayan forward Pedro Petrone. It reads: "Petrone was world champion three times and scored for Uruguay in the 1924 and 1928 Olympic finals."

References 

Uruguay national football team
Association football culture
Sports symbols